Purvanchal Express is a weekly Express train of Indian Railways linking city of Kolkata with Gorakhpur via Siwan district of Bihar.

Stoppage
This is a long-distance express route and covers its journey within a day over 860 kilometers at a speed of 50 km/h. It has stops on stations such as: 

Naihati
Bandel
Burdwan
Durgapur
Asansol
Madhupur
Jasidih
Jhajha
Barauni
Samastipur
Muzaffarpur
Hajipur
Chhapra 
Siwan
Gorakhpur

Rake sharing
The train shares its rake with 15049/50 Kolkata–Gorakhpur Express (via Ballia), 15051/52 Kolkata–Gorakhpur Express (via Narkatiaganj) and 15009/10 Gorakhpur - Mailani Gomti Nagar Express. The three pairs of trains are commonly known as Purvanchal Express via Ballia and Purvanchal Express via Narkatiaganj.

Facility
This train has the facility of AC 1 cum AC 2 tier, AC 2 tier, AC 3 tier, Sleeper Class, Second class sitting and General sitting type of coaches. All the classes except General class requires prior reservation. Tatkal scheme is available in this train, whereas pantry car facility is not available.It is hauled by Electric Loco Shed,  electric loco shed based WAP-4 or Sealdah electric loco based WAP-7 from Kolkata to Gorakhpur

This train is very popular among the travelers as a result of this the people have to book their ticket in advance at least two months before and even in some cases the Tatkal tickets are also unavailable due to its high demand.

It is the most popular train connecting Howrah division with North Bihar and Northwest Uttar Pradesh.

Train detail

See also
List of named passenger trains in India
Sealdah–Ballia Express

References

 
 
 

Passenger trains originating from Gorakhpur
Transport in Kolkata
Named passenger trains of India
Rail transport in West Bengal
Rail transport in Jharkhand
Rail transport in Bihar
Express trains in India